Leroy Harris may refer to:

Leroy Harris (offensive lineman) (born 1984), American football offensive lineman
Leroy Harris (running back) (born 1954), former American football running back
Leroy Harris, Sr. (died 1969), American jazz musician
Leroy Harris, Jr. (1916-2005), American jazz musician